Tomás Alage Mendes Mendes (born 21 November 2004) is a Spanish professional footballer who plays as a defensive midfielder for Spanish club Alavés B.

Club career
Mendes is a youth product of La Mojonera and Almería, before joining the youth academy of Alavés in 2018. He began his senior career with the reserves Alavés B in 2020. On 4 March 2021, Mendes signed a professional contract keeping him with Alavés at least until 2023. He was a mainstay with Alavés B at the age of 17, and helped them win the 2021–22 Tercera División RFEF and earn promotion. He made his first appearance with the senior Alavés team in a 3–0 Copa del Rey win over Unami on 30 November 2021, coming on as a substitute in the 84th minute. He made his La Liga and professional debut with Alavés in a 4–0 loss to Celta Vigo on 7 May 2022, coming on in the 82nd minute.

International career
Born in Spain, Mendes is of Bissau-Guinean descent. He is a youth international for Spain, having represented the Spain U15s and U16s. He represented the Spain U18's in a friendly tournament in Romania in the fall of 2021.

References

External links
 
 
 

2004 births
Living people
Footballers from Almería
Spanish footballers
Spain youth international footballers
Spanish people of Bissau-Guinean descent
Spanish sportspeople of African descent
Association football midfielders
La Liga players
Primera Federación players
Tercera Federación players
Deportivo Alavés players
Deportivo Alavés B players